Le Palais is a commune in the Morbihan department of Brittany in northwestern France. It is one of the four communes on the island of Belle Île.

Inhabitants of Le Palais are called in French Palantins.

Geography

Le Palais is one of the four communes of Belle île en Mer. It is the most populated. It houses the administrative center and the main port of the island.

Map

Population
Le Palais's population peaks in 1872.

See also
Communes of the Morbihan department

References

External links

 Mayors of Morbihan Association 

Communes of Morbihan
Vauban fortifications in France
Populated coastal places in Brittany